Miek is a fictional character appearing in American comic books published by Marvel Comics.

Miek appears in the Marvel Cinematic Universe (MCU) films Thor: Ragnarok (2017), Avengers: Endgame (2019), and Thor: Love and Thunder (2022). Originally depicted as a silent CGI character, he is portrayed by Carly Rees and voiced by Stephen Murdoch in the latter film.

Publication history
Miek first appeared in The Incredible Hulk vol. 3 #92 during the "Planet Hulk" storyline, and was created by Greg Pak and Carlo Pagulayan.

Fictional character biography
Miek was a member of planet Sakaar's native race of insectoids. When he was young, local Imperials attacked and killed his father and most of his hive, forcing Miek to flee underground. He was accidentally rescued, as an outcast slave, during Hulk's battle with the Red King. Soon after, the Warbound escaped with Miek secretly leading them to the place where his father was killed. The Warbound then aided him in securing his revenge. Miek and Brood, who have formed a connection due to their insect nature, freed Miek's brothers and added the Warbound to their Hive. Within a short time, he underwent a metamorphosis and evolved into a giant heavily armored "King" version of his race.

Miek located one of the last Queens of his race, at an egg farm at which the Warbound were hiding. Unfortunately for Miek, and his species, the Queen was consumed by a Spike infection and had to be killed. Miek led the Warbound in Hulk's place while Hulk, Hiroim, and Caiera attempted to obtain the allegiance of Caiera and Hiroim's people.

Following the death of Caiera Oldstrong, Miek and the rest of the Warbound accompanied the Hulk back to Earth, where he pledged to aid him in a quest for vengeance against those responsible for the Hulk's forced exile.

On Earth, Miek was one of the most vocal in encouraging the destruction of the planet in revenge for what was done. By the end, it was revealed that Miek knew all along that the Illuminati were not responsible. Red King loyalists had planted a damaged warp core on the Hulk's ship hoping it would kill the Hulk. Miek did not tell the Hulk hoping it would encourage the Hulk to keep destroying. Enraged, the Hulk and No-Name nearly killed Miek. After the Hulk's defeat, Miek was captured by S.H.I.E.L.D. in Wonderland and relayed information about the Warbound to help recapture them.

Following the Secret Invasion storyline, Miek was presumably still imprisoned in the Negative Zone supervised by Wonderland's freed inmates.

Chaos War
Miek made a full recovery as he remained locked away in Prison 42 and stayed there until Amatsu-Mikaboshi became the Chaos King and attacked all of reality. As order gave way to chaos, Miek found his freedom along with many other prisoners. He pledged his service to the Chaos King, who sought to destroy everything much like Miek wished Hulk would.

With an army of other former prisoners, Miek attacked Amadeus Cho and Galactus as they attempted to complete a gateway to a pocket universe to save creation. Cho recognized him from the attack on New York but could not reason with him. Miek was unwilling to trust anything Cho said and tried to stop Cho from completing the gateway. Despite Miek initially having the upper hand and nearly killing Cho, an earthquake caused by the fight between Chaos King and Hercules caused him to lose his prey. Amadeus quickly knocked him with the Golden Mace, causing Miek to fly away.

Planet Savage
Miek found that as a result of his exposure to the Chaos King's energies, he had become biologically female. This allowed her to lay clutches of eggs, but the hatchlings could not survive long after birth. Miek found her way to the Savage Land, and in the process of asserting herself there, slaughtered forty-three Sakaarian refugees residing there. She had also grown considerably larger and more powerful through this time. Ka-Zar contacted Hulk regarding the deaths of the Sakaarians, and Hulk assembled his Warbound and headed there directly, despite the grievous injuries he'd sustained from his battle with Zeus. During the Warbound's first night there, the Sakaarian elder had drugged the group, allowing Miek and her insect horde to abduct the Hulk. The elder had agreed with Miek that his people would be spared if he helped Miek obtain the Hulk as a sacrifice.

Miek had attempted to supplant her hatchlings into the bodies of Sakaarians to keep them fed and safe, but that had not worked. When attempting it with the Hulk's unconscious body, the hatchlings thrived. Using exceedingly strong insect chemicals, Miek kept the Hulk drugged and under mind control, while her hatchlings gestated in Hulk's chest, even sending the mind-controlled Hulk against his own Warbound in an attempt to stop them from rescuing his captive. When the Hulk's rage burned off the mind control, Miek tried to convince the Warbound to help them keep her hatchlings alive.

Hulk then tore the infants from her chest and attempted to stomp them, before he set about killing Miek. Skaar then tackled Hulk, smashing his head into the ground, and calling him a "stupid monster". Skaar promised the infant insects that no one would hurt them and that he'd care for them, as he could sympathize with their plight. Miek attempted to drug Skaar, to make him kill his father, only to have another of her arms chopped off by Hulk, who then punched Miek through a volcano and across the Savage Land into a mountain of ice. Hulk chased after and tried to save Miek, but Miek would not let him and fell presumably to her death.

Powers and abilities
As a Sakaaran Native, Miek hatched from an egg in a grub-like larval stage and eventually entered a cocoon-like pupae stage after several months. Six months later, he emerged from his cocoon as an adult Native, with fully formed antennae, six limbs, and postpharyngeal glands used to communicate with other members of their familial hive. Later in life, Miek entered into a second pupae stage and emerged as a Native king, with an armor-like chitinous carapace, longer mandibles, clawed phalanges, and overall greater body mass.

As a gladiator on Sakaar, he developed six-limbed fighting skills, often wielding four weapons at a time to keep his opponents off-balance.

Other versions

Marvel Zombies Return
In the 4th issue of Marvel Zombies Return, when Hulk and the Warbound land on the moon they are met by zombified versions of Giant-Man and the Immortals. There, Miek and No-Name are soon killed and eaten by Giant-Man.

What If?
 In the What If? issue revolving around Planet Hulk called What if Caiera the Oldstrong had survived the destruction of Sakaar instead of the Hulk?, Miek is also killed in the destruction of Sakaar when they run into a volcanic crack formed as Sakaar breaks apart, believing that the Hulk is coming towards them, and is burned to death. His death prevents anyone from discovering the truth of Sakaar's destruction and leads to Caiera's conquest of Earth.
 Miek was also featured in a What If? issue revolving around "World War Hulk". In the first story, he is killed alongside the Warbound and the heroes that are present when Iron Man does not hesitate to use the laser on Hulk. In the second story, Miek's treachery is known after Thor successfully reasoned with Hulk.

In other media

Television
 Miek appeared in The Super Hero Squad Show episode "Planet Hulk! (Six Against Infinity, Part 5)", voiced by Dave Wittenberg.
 Miek appears in the Hulk and the Agents of S.M.A.S.H. episode "Planet Leader", voiced by Benjamin Diskin. This version is a native of Sakaar who was enslaved by the Leader alongside many others until being freed by the Agents of S.M.A.S.H..

Film
 Miek appears in Planet Hulk, voiced by Sam Vincent. This version is cowardly yet good-natured and friendly, and also looks up to the Hulk as a friend. As opposed to his comics counterpart, Miek becomes braver over the course of the film, single-handedly fighting and killing a traitor who was about to kill his friends.
 Miek appears in films set in the Marvel Cinematic Universe (MCU). This version is a larva-like creature who initially uses an exoskeleton equipped with blades and is a friend of Korg.
 Miek first appears in Thor: Ragnarok (2017). While being forced by the Grandmaster to fight in gladiatorial combat on the planet Sakaar, Miek and Korg meet and befriend Thor after he arrives. When Thor stages an escape, Valkyrie frees Miek, Korg, and the rest of the gladiators to start a rebellion. After hijacking the Grandmaster's starship, the Statesman, the gladiators help Thor evacuate Asgard before joining him on a journey to find a new home for the Asgardian refugees.
 In Avengers: Endgame (2019), five years after surviving Thanos' attack on the Statesman and the Blip off-screen during the events of the film Avengers: Infinity War, Miek has settled on Earth in New Asgard, Norway alongside Korg and Thor. Miek and Korg later help Thor, the Avengers, and their allies fight off an alternate timeline version of Thanos.
 Miek makes a minor appearance in Thor: Love and Thunder (2022), portrayed by Carly Rees and voiced by Stephen Murdoch. Having metamorphosed into a female form, she now travels in a robotic exoskeleton made to look like a well-dressed woman.

Video games
Miek appears in Marvel: Contest of Champions.

See also
 Warbound
 Planet Hulk
 World War Hulk

References

External links
 Miek at Marvel.com

Superhero film characters
Comics characters introduced in 2006
Characters created by Greg Pak
Fictional gladiators
Fictional insects
Fictional slaves
Marvel Comics aliens
Marvel Comics extraterrestrial supervillains
Marvel Comics extraterrestrial superheroes
Marvel Comics supervillains
Marvel Comics superheroes